De Pons or de Pons may refer to:

Antoinette de Pons-Ribérac (1560–1632), French courtier
Bonne de Pons d'Heudicourt (1644–1709), French courtier
Geoffroy III de Pons (died 1191), French noble
Jaufre de Pons (  13th-cent.), French troubadour
Louis Marc Pons, marquis de Pons ( 1789), French diplomat
Rainaut de Pons ( 12th or 13th-cent.), French troubadour of indiscernible identity
Renaud de Pons (seneschal of Gascony) ( 1189–1228), French noble and Crusader; uncle of Renaud II de Pons
Renaud II de Pons ( 1170–1252), French noble and Crusader; nephew of Renaud de Pons (seneschal of Gascony)

Places
Keep of Pons, Château de Pons, or Donjon de Pons (founded 1187), a French fortified tower

See also
 Dupont (disambiguation)